The Dibb House is a historic home located at Bel Air, Harford County, Maryland, United States. It is a -story frame house with a gable roof and a central projecting bay with cross gable. In Victorian style, it features a myriad of porches, oriels, and bay and dormer windows.  Also on the property are a shed, a barn, and an outhouse.

The Dibb House was listed on the National Register of Historic Places in 1980.

References

External links
, including photo from 1978, Maryland Historical Trust

Houses in Bel Air, Harford County, Maryland
Houses on the National Register of Historic Places in Maryland
Houses completed in 1897
Victorian architecture in Maryland
National Register of Historic Places in Harford County, Maryland